Michal Ranko (born 19 February 1994) is a Slovak professional footballer who plays for Zemplín Michalovce.

Club career

ViOn Zlaté Moravce
Ranko made his professional Fortuna Liga debut for ViOn Zlaté Moravce against AS Trenčín on 30 July 2016.

On 26 July 2018, he signed a contract with Motor Lublin.

References

External links
 Eurofotbal profile 
 
 Futbalnet profile 

1994 births
Living people
Sportspeople from Trenčín
Slovak footballers
Association football defenders
FK Dubnica players
AFC Nové Mesto nad Váhom players
FC ViOn Zlaté Moravce players
FK Senica players
Motor Lublin players
MFK Skalica players
MFK Zemplín Michalovce players
Slovak Super Liga players
2. Liga (Slovakia) players
III liga players
Expatriate footballers in Poland
Slovak expatriate sportspeople in Poland